Waitaki District Council is the territorial authority for the Waitaki District of New Zealand.

The council is led by the mayor of Waitaki, who is currently . There are also 10 ward councillors.

Composition

Councillors

 Mayor 
 Ahuriri Ward: 1 member
 Corriedale Ward: 2 members
 Oamaru Ward: 6 members
 Waihemo Ward: 1 member

History

The council was formed in 1989. Its predecessors were Oamaru Borough Council (1866-1989), Palmerston County Council (1872-1966), Waitaki County Council (1876-1989), and Hampden Borough Council (1879-1989).

In 2020, the council had 295 staff, including 40 earning more than $100,000. According to the Taxpayers' Union think tank, residential rates averaged $2,343.

References

External links

 Official website

Waitaki District
Politics of Otago
Territorial authorities of New Zealand